Elytraria, scalystem, is a genus of flowering plants in the family Acanthaceae, with a pantropical distribution. They tend to lack stems.

Species
Currently accepted species include:
Elytraria acaulis (L.f.) Lindau
Elytraria bissei H.Dietr.
Elytraria bromoides Oerst.
Elytraria caroliniensis (J.F.Gmel.) Pers.
Elytraria cubana Alain
Elytraria filicaulis Borhidi & O.Muñiz
Elytraria imbricata (Vahl) Pers.
Elytraria ivorensis Dokosi
Elytraria klugii Leonard
Elytraria macrophylla Leonard
Elytraria madagascariensis (Benoist) E.Hossain
Elytraria marginata Vahl
Elytraria maritima J.K.Morton
Elytraria mexicana Fryxell & S.D.Koch
Elytraria minor Dokosi
Elytraria nodosa E.Hossain
Elytraria planifolia Leonard
Elytraria prolifera Leonard
Elytraria shaferi (P.Wilson) Leonard
Elytraria spathulifolia Borhidi & O.Muñiz
Elytraria tuberosa Leonard

References

Acanthaceae
Acanthaceae genera